Kevin Rafael Escamilla Moreno (born 21 February 1994) is a Mexican professional footballer who plays as a defensive midfielder for Liga MX club Querétaro.

Honours
Mexico Youth
FIFA U-17 World Cup: 2011
Pan American Silver Medal: 2015

Personal life
His younger brother Jorge also plays for UNAM.

External links
 

1994 births
Living people
Association football midfielders
Club Universidad Nacional footballers
Deportivo Toluca F.C. players
Querétaro F.C. footballers
Liga MX players
Liga Premier de México players
Footballers from Mexico City
Pan American Games silver medalists for Mexico
Medalists at the 2015 Pan American Games
Pan American Games medalists in football
21st-century Mexican people
Mexican footballers